MTVph (formerly MTV Philippines and MTV Pinoy) was a 24-hour music/entertainment television network co-owned by ViacomCBS Networks International Asia and Solar Entertainment Corporation. The network was launched on August 1, 2017, on all cable/satellite providers in the Philippines.

History

Prior to its launch, the channel was known as MTV Philippines and MTV Pinoy. During the MTV Philippines years, the joint venture ownership of the channel had been changed (from 2001-2007, it was Nation Broadcasting Corporation and in 2007-2010, it was All Youth Channels, Inc.). The first incarnation of MTV in the Philippines (as MTV Philippines) ceased operations on February 15, 2010, with "Video Killed The Radio Star" by The Buggles was played as the final song (the song was also played as the very first music video played in MTV USA back in 1981 and it was also played on MTV Classic in the US, as well as on MTV Classic UK and Australia, when the respective channels were rebranded from its predecessors).

Four years later, MTV in the Philippines was relaunched on February 14, 2014, as MTV Pinoy, replacing MTV Southeast Asia. The first music video to be played on that former channel is  "Dear Lonely" performed by Zia Quizon. The channel was co-owned by MTV Networks Asia Pacific and Viva Communications, with the latter providing the infrastructure. One of the notable programs that were aired on MTV Pinoy was MTV Halo-Halo.

On January 1, 2017, the feed of MTV Pinoy was reverted to those for MTV Southeast Asia. This was possibly due to Viacom switching partnerships from Viva to rival company Solar Entertainment, as well as the intense competition from ABS-CBN's music network, Myx. OPM related programs from MTV Pinoy were transferred to Viva TV, And only MTV Pinoy Pop and some local advertising remained, and was shown on the Southeast Asia feed until March 6 of the same year. MTV Pinoy would be replaced by the Solar-owned MTVph starting August 1, on the American network's 36th birthday.

On July 19, 2017, Viacom International Media Networks and Solar Entertainment Corporation, a Philippine content provider and television network, announced that they would launch the Philippine feed of MTV Southeast Asia as MTVph.

As with MTV's other Filipino ventures since the Fifth Republic was constituted, MTV Pinoy failed to attract any audience, and the network closed on January 1, 2019, being reverted with MTV Southeast Asia.

Technical information
Unlike most MTV channels around the world and its previous channel (MTV Pinoy), MTVph was broadcast in 4:3 aspect ratio (16:9 letterbox) that most channels broadcast by Solar Entertainment use (with the exception of Solar All-Access and Solar Sports). For programs that aired from MTV Southeast Asia, Solar retained the original aspect ratio for programs that air from MTV Southeast Asia, albeit downscaled to 480i.

Programming
Unlike the previous two MTV channels in the Philippines (MTV Philippines and MTV Pinoy), MTVph aired in MTV Southeast Asia Philippine feed.

See also
MTV Philippines
MTV Pinoy
MTV Asia
Myx
Solar Entertainment Corporation
ViacomCBS
Channel V

References

MTV channels
Former Solar Entertainment Corporation channels
Defunct television networks in the Philippines
Television networks in the Philippines
Television channels and stations established in 2017
Television channels and stations disestablished in 2018
2017 establishments in the Philippines
2018 disestablishments in the Philippines
Music video networks in the Philippines